The 22121/22122 Lokmanya Tilak Terminus–Lucknow AC Superfast Express (abbreviated as LTT–Lucknow AC SF Express) is a Superfast Express train of AC Express series belonging to Indian Railways (Central Railway zone) that runs between Mumbai and Lucknow in India. It was introduced on 8 April 2017, with fully air-conditioned LHB coach. It is a weekly service. This train shares its rake with Lokmanya Tilak Terminus–Hazrat Nizamuddin AC Express.

Coaches
The LTT-Lucknow AC Superfast Express generally has one AC 1st class coaches, three AC 2 tier class coaches, one pantry car, two luggage cum generator coaches and fifteen AC 3 tier coaches, for a total of 22 coaches. As is customary with most train services in India, coach composition may be amended at the discretion of Indian Railways depending on demand. It has fully air-conditioned LHB coach.

 EOG consists of Luggage and Generator coach
 B consists of AC 3 Tier coach
 PC consists of Pantry car coach
 A consists of AC 2 Tier coach
 H consists of First Class AC coach
 HA consists of First Class AC 2 Tier coach

Schedule
22121 AC Superfast Express leaves Mumbai LTT every Saturday at 14:20 hrs IST and reaches the Lucknow Charbagh at 13:45 hrs IST on the next day. On return, the 22122 AC Superfast Express leaves Lucknow Charbagh every Sunday at 16:20 hrs IST from platform number 3 and reaches the Mumbai LTT at 17:30 hrs IST on the next day.

Service

As the average speed of the train is above , as per Indian Railways rules, its fare includes a Superfast Express surcharge.

Routeing

Traction
As the route is electrified, all types of electric locos power the train up to its destination. The LTT-Lucknow AC Superfast Express is mostly hauled by Kalyan-based WAP-7 or Ajni-based WAP-7, from start to end.

References

External links
22121 AC Express at India Rail Info
22122 AC Express at India Rail Info

Transport in Mumbai
AC Express (Indian Railways) trains
Rail transport in Maharashtra
Rail transport in Madhya Pradesh
Passenger trains originating from Lucknow